Humid Limbs of the Torn Beadsman is the debut studio album of Abu Lahab, independently released on August 4, 2012.

Track listing

Personnel
Adapted from the Humid Limbs of the Torn Beadsman liner notes.
 Abu Lahab – vocals, instruments, cover art

References

External links 
 Humid Limbs of the Torn Beadsman at Discogs (list of releases)
 Humid Limbs of the Torn Beadsman on YouTube

2012 debut albums
Abu Lahab (musical project) albums